Four Mile Road is a census-designated place (CDP) in Yukon-Koyukuk Census Area, Alaska, United States. The population was 43 at the 2010 census, up from 38 in 2000.

Geography
Four Mile Road is located at  (64.596324, -149.125480). It is located next to George Parks Highway or you can get there by the Nenana Municipal Airport in Nenana down South.

To the right of the city, there is the Nenana River.

Demographics

Four Mile Road first appeared on the 2000 U.S. Census as a census-designated place (CDP).

As of the census of 2000, there were 38 people, 16 households, and 10 families residing in the CDP. There were 19 housing units at an average density of 21.0/sq mi (8.2/km2). The racial makeup of the CDP was 73.68% White and 26.32% Native American.

There were 16 households, out of which 31.3% had children under the age of 18 living with them, 50.0% were married couples living together, 6.3% had a female householder with no husband present, and 37.5% were non-families. 37.5% of all households were made up of individuals, and none had someone living alone who was 65 years of age or older. The average household size was 2.38 and the average family size was 3.20.

In the CDP, the population was spread out, with 31.6% under the age of 18, 5.3% from 18 to 24, 34.2% from 25 to 44, 23.7% from 45 to 64, and 5.3% who were 65 years of age or older. The median age was 30 years. For every 100 females, there were 111.1 males. For every 100 females age 18 and over, there were 136.4 males.

The median income for a household in the CDP was $53,125, and the median income for a family was $66,250. Males had a median income of $27,083 versus $8,000 for females. The per capita income for the CDP was $28,465. None of the population and none of the families were below the poverty line.

References

Census-designated places in Alaska
Census-designated places in Unorganized Borough, Alaska
Census-designated places in Yukon–Koyukuk Census Area, Alaska